The Nebraska Cornhuskers women's gymnastics team represents the University of Nebraska–Lincoln in the Big Ten Conference. Since being established in 1975, the program has won twenty-three conference championships and qualified for the NCAA Women's Gymnastics Championships twenty-seven times. The Cornhuskers have had five individual national champions and 163 total All-Americans.

The team has been coached by former all-around national champion Heather Brink since 2019.

History
The team was established in 1975, initially without a head coach. After the program's first season, Nebraska hired Karen Balke to lead a team of entirely freshmen and sophomores. Judy Schalk took over in 1977, leading the Huskers to five conference titles and an AIAW bid in six seasons as head coach. In 1983, Rick Walton was hired as head coach, and under his guidance the program won its first NCAA individual event title, when Michele Bryant came in first place on the vault in 1990. From 1987 to 1990, Walton captured four straight Big Eight titles, taking the Huskers to the NCAA Championships each year, including a program-best fourth-place national finish in 1989.

After the 1993 season, Walton left the program and the Cornhuskers hired Dan Kendig. In his first year, he led NU to a conference championship and was named Big Eight Coach of the Year. In 1997, the Huskers reached the Super Six Finals for the first time under the new NCAA Championship format, beating No. 1 Utah to claim the final spot. Kendig was named national coach of the year in 1999 after winning a sixth consecutive conference title. Before leaving for the Big Ten in 2011, the Huskers claimed more Big 12 gymnastics titles than any other program.

Kendig retired in 2019 amid NCAA compliance issues and assistant Heather Brink was named head coach.

Coaches

Coaching history

Coaching staff

Awards

All-Americans
Nebraska has had thirty-three athletes earn fifty-nine first-team All-American selections and 165 total All-American awards.

Individual NCAA Champions

Michele Bryant – Vault 

Season-by-season results

Notes

References

Women